The Mortara–Milan railway is a railway line in Lombardy, Italy.

History 
The section from Mortara to Vigevano was opened in 1854 by the Kingdom of Sardinia. The section from Vigevano to Milan was put into service after the Italian unification, in 1870.

See also 
 List of railway lines in Italy

References

Footnotes

Sources
 
 

Railway lines in Lombardy
Railway lines opened in 1870